Harpalpur is a village and corresponding community development block in Sawayajpur tehsil of Hardoi district, Uttar Pradesh, India. It is located west of Sandi, on the road to Fatehgarh. The main staple crops here are wheat, rice, and maize. Markets are held twice weekly. As of 2011, the population of Harpalpur is 8,822, in 1,544 households. The total block population is 172,224, in 29,232 households.

History 
Around the turn of the 20th century, Harpalpur's main landowner was the Rani of Katiari, who held the village on a permanent settlement. It had become the site of a police station, which was previously located in the neighbouring village of Palia. As of the 1901 census, its population was 1,182, including 91 Muslims.

The 1961 census recorded Harpalpur as comprising 3 hamlets, with a total population of 1,779 (968 male and 811 female), in 368 households and 214 physical houses. The area of the village was given as 1,295 acres. Amenities recorded at the time included a medical practitioner, a hospital, and a post office.

The 1981 census recorded Harpalpur as having a population of 344, in 64 households, and covering an area of 497.38 hectares.

Villages 
Harpalpur CD block has the following 113 villages:

References 

Villages in Hardoi district